Athletics competitions at the 2001 South Pacific Mini Games were held in Middlegate, Norfolk Island, between December 10–14, 2001.

A total of 43 events were contested, 22 by men and 21 by women.

Medal summary
Medal winners and their results were published on the Athletics Weekly webpage
courtesy of Tony Isaacs and Børre Lilloe, and on the Oceania Athletics Association webpage by Bob Snow.

Complete results can also be found on the Athletics PNG webpage.

Men

Women

Medal table (unofficial)

Participation (unofficial)
Athletes from the following 16 countries were reported to participate:

 
 
 
 
 
 
 
 
 
 
 
 
 
/

References

External links
Pacific Games Council
Oceania Athletics Association

Athletics at the Pacific Mini Games
Athletics in Norfolk Island
South Pacific Mini Games
2001 in Norfolk Island
2001 Pacific Games